Streptomyces ochraceiscleroticus is a bacterium species from the genus of Streptomyces which has been isolated from soil.

See also 
 List of Streptomyces species

References

Further reading

External links
Type strain of Streptomyces ochraceiscleroticus at BacDive -  the Bacterial Diversity Metadatabase

ochraceiscleroticus
Bacteria described in 1970